The concept of an immaterial and  immortal soul – distinct from the body – did not appear in Judaism before the Babylonian exile, but developed as a result of interaction with Persian and  Hellenistic philosophies. Accordingly, the Hebrew word , nephesh, although translated as "soul" in some older English-language Bibles, actually has a meaning closer to "living being". The New Testament also uses the word , but with the Hebrew meaning and not the Greek.

The textual evidence indicates a multiplicity of perspectives on souls, including probable changes during the centuries in which the biblical  corpus developed.

Relation to Greek "psyche"
The only Hebrew word traditionally translated "soul" (nephesh) in English-language Bibles refers to a living, breathing conscious body, rather than to an immortal soul. In the New Testament, the Greek word traditionally translated "soul" "psyche", has substantially the same meaning as the Hebrew, without reference to an immortal soul. In the Greek Septuagent psyche is used to translate each instance of nephesh.

Genesis 2:7
According to  God did not make a body and put a soul into it like a letter into an envelope of dust; rather he formed man's body from the dust, then, by breathing divine breath into it, he made the body of dust live, i.e. the dust did not embody a soul, but it became a soul – a whole creature.

Rabbinic understanding of Genesis 2:7 as found in the Targum

And the Lord God created man in two formations; and took dust from the place of the house of the sanctuary, and from the four winds of the world, and mixed from all the waters of the world, and created him red, black, and white; and breathed into his nostrils the inspiration of life, and there was in the body of Adam the inspiration of a speaking spirit, unto the illumination of the eyes and the hearing of the ears. –Targum Pseudo-Jonathan
And the Lord God created Adam from dust of the ground, and breathed upon his face the breath of lives, and it became in Adam a Discoursing Spirit. –Targum Onkelos

Man as nephesh

    Here and "all through Scripture" a "living soul" denotes a "living person". This is because, as Brevard Childs writes, in the biblical view, a person "does not have a soul, but is a soul".

Animals as nephesh

In 1 Corinthians 15:45 (KJV), soul [psūchê] is defined based on an interpretation of Old Testament text. "And so it is written, The first man Adam was made a living soul[psūchê]; the last Adam was made a quickening spirit."()

New Testament
The New Testament counterpart to the Old Testament word for soul, nephesh, is psyche. The two words carry a similar range of meanings. Both can designate the person or the person’s life as a whole. For all uses and meanings of psyche/ψυχἠ, see Joseph Henry Thayer, A Greek-English Lexicon of the New Testament.

Death of the soul

According to some writers, nephesh and psūchê are not naturally immortal. They die and are uncomprehending during the time between death and Judgment Day resurrection, also known as the intermediate state.

John Goldingay writes, "The life of a human being came more directly from God, and it is also evident that when someone dies, the breath (rûaḥ, e.g., Ps 104:29) or the life (nepeš, e.g., Gen 35:18) disappears and returns to the God who is rûaḥ."

Immortality

The concept of an immaterial soul separate from and surviving the body is common today but according to modern scholars, it was not found in ancient Hebrew beliefs.  The word nephesh never means an immortal soul or an incorporeal part of the human being that can survive death of the body as the spirit of dead,

Traditional Christianity
In Patristic thought, towards the end of the 2nd century, psūchê had begun to be understood in a more Greek than a Hebrew way, contrasted with the body. By the 3rd century, with the influence of Origen, the traditions of the inherent immortality of the soul and its divine nature were established. As the new Encyclopædia Britannica points out: “The early Christian philosophers adopted the Greek concept of the soul’s immortality and thought of the soul as being created by God and infused into the body at conception.” Inherent immortality of the soul was accepted among western and eastern theologians throughout the Middle Ages, and after the Reformation, as evidenced by the Westminster Confession.

Modern scholarship

The modern scholarly consensus holds that the canonical teaching of the Old Testament made no reference to an immortal soul independent of the body.
A wide range of scholarly reference works consistently represent this view. In recent times, a minority of scholars have partially dissented from this view.

Many modern theologians reject the view that the Bible teaches the doctrine of the immortal soul,
and Hebblethwaite claims the doctrine is "not popular amongst Christian theologians or among Christian philosophers today".

Notes

External links
 Stewart Salmond, The Christian Doctrine of Immortality

Biblical topics
Christian theology of the Bible
Jewish philosophy
Christian anthropology